Phoracantha recurva, the lesser Eucalyptus longhorn, is a species of beetle in the family Cerambycidae. It is widespread in many countries and in the early 2000s it was also observed in Sardinia, perhaps brought by a ship.

Description
This medium-sized beetle features a complex pattern of cream and brown markings.

It is similar to the related P. semipunctata, but differs in the smaller size and more limited dark markings. Unlike that species the basal portion of the elytra appears dominantly pale, with only a few separated dark spots instead of a series of closer markings.

References

Phoracanthini
Beetles described in 1840